Albin Sundsvik (born April 27, 2001) is a Swedish professional ice hockey centre who currently plays for Skellefteå AIK of the Swedish Hockey League (SHL). Sundsvik was drafted by the Anaheim Ducks in the sixth round of the 2020 NHL Entry Draft with the 160th overall pick.

Career statistics

Regular season and playoffs

International

References

External links

2001 births
Living people
Anaheim Ducks draft picks
Skellefteå AIK players
Ice hockey people from Stockholm
Swedish ice hockey centres